Sculpture with a "D" is an abstract sculpture by Sam Gilliam. 

It is located at Davis (MBTA station), Somerville, Massachusetts. Painted aluminum panels 44 feet long are hung above the platform.

References

External links

Arts on the Line
Cambridge, Massachusetts
1983 sculptures